The Diocese of Lolland–Falster (Danish: Lolland–Falsters Stift) is a diocese within the Evangelical Lutheran Church of Denmark. It comprises Lolland and Falster as well as a number of smaller islands in the south-eastern corner of Denmark. The diocese was disjoined from the Diocese of Funen in 1803 and is the smallest of the 10 dioceses within the Danish state church. The main church is Maribo Cathedral in Maribo but the bishop resides in Nykøbing Falster.

Subdivisions
Since 1 January 2007, the diocese is divided into the following provostier:
 Maribo Domprovsti (Maribo Cathedral)
 Lolland Vestre Provsti (Western Lolland)
 Lolland Østre Provsti (Eastern Lolland)
 Falster Provsti (Falster)

Bishops of Lolland–Falster
 1803–1805: Andreas Birch
 1805–1831: Peter Outzen Boisen
 1831–1842: Rasmus Møller
 1843–1845: Gerhard Peter Brammer
 1845–1848: Peter Christian Stenersen Gad
 1849–1854: Ditlev Gothard Monrad (1st term)
 1854–1856: Jørgen Hjort Lautrup
 1856–1871: Severin Claudius Wilken Bindesbøll
 1871–1887: Ditlev Gothard Monrad (2nd term)
 1887–1899: Hans Valdemar Sthyr
 1899–1903: Henrik Christian von Leuenbach
 1903–1907: Hans Sophus Sørensen
 1907–1923: Caspar Frederik Johansen Wegener
 1923–1942: Johan John Aschlund Ammundsen
 1942–1950: Niels Munk Plum
 1950–1964: Halfdan Høgsbro
 1964–1969: Haldor Hald
 1969–1996: Thorkild E. Græsholt
 1996–2005: Holger Jepsen
 2005–2017: Steen Skovsgaard
 2017–present: Marianne Gaarden

Stiftsamtmand office holders
 1737–1763: Christian Frederik Raben (?)
 1850–1885: Frederik Christian von Holsten
 1885–1886: Iver Emil Hermann William Unsgaard
 1890–1903: Conrad Alexander Fabritius de Tengnagel
 1903–1912: Gustav Hakon Valdemar Feddersen
 1912–19??: Waldemar Oxholm

See also
List of churches on Falster
List of churches on Lolland

References

Church of Denmark dioceses
1803 establishments in Denmark
Diocese of Lolland Falster
Diocese of Lolland Falster